The Provincial Court of New Brunswick is the lower trial court of the province of New Brunswick. It hears cases relating to criminal law and other statutes. The court system of New Brunswick also has a Mental Health Court located in Saint John. The provincial bench has 22 judges, 9 supernumerary judges (as of February 2018), and 2 per diem judges.

Judges of the Provincial Court of New Brunswick

Current Judges

Supernumerary

Previous Judges
 Judge Fred Ferguson
 Judge S.M. Hutchinson
 Judge P.L. Cumming
 Judge T. Denis Lordon
 Judge Murray F. Cain

Sources

External links
 Provincial Court of New Brunswick website
 Mental Health Court website
 List of Judges by Region (gnb.ca)

New Brunswick courts
New_Brunswick